Phoenicolacerta cyanisparsa is a species of lizard in the family Lacertidae. It is found in Syria and Turkey. It is an egg-laying species. The population trend of Phoenicolacerta cyanisparsa is stable. It is abundant within its small range.

Habitat
Its natural habitats are rocky habitats with Mediterranean-type shrubby vegetation. It can also occur in lightly grazed or cultivated areas.

References

Phoenicolacerta
Lizards of Asia
Reptiles of Syria
Reptiles of Turkey
Reptiles described in 1999
Taxa named by Josef Friedrich Schmidtler
Taxa named by Wolfgang Bischoff
Taxonomy articles created by Polbot